Zelmira is an opera in two acts by Gioachino Rossini to a libretto by Andrea Leone Tottola. Based on the French play, Zelmire by de Belloy, it was the last of the composer's Neapolitan operas. Stendhal called its music Teutonic, comparing it with La clemenza di Tito but remarking: "...while Mozart would probably, had he lived, have grown completely Italian, Rossini may well, by the end of his career, have become more German than Beethoven himself!"

Performance history
The first performance of Zelmira was in Naples at the Teatro di San Carlo on 16 February 1822. This was followed by a successful premiere in Vienna on 13 April 1822, as part of a three-month-long Rossini Festival for which Rossini wrote some additional music. Performances in several Italian cities were followed by the London premiere on 24 January 1824, with Rossini conducting and Isabella Colbran (now his wife) in the title role. It was seen in Paris in 1826. 
There was one presentation in the US in New Orleans "around" 1835.

Over 100 years were to pass before the opera was presented in Naples in 1965, but "to no great acclaim".  The work was given a production by the Rome Opera in 1989 and revived at the Pesaro Festival in 2009 with a cast including 
Juan Diego Flórez, Kate Aldrich and Gregory Kunde.

Roles

Synopsis

The opera's complicated plot revolves around Zelmira, her father Polidoro, the wise and  beloved king of the Isle of Lesbos, and her husband, Prince Ilo. Before the action begins, Ilo had departed the island to defend his homeland. While he was gone, Azor, the lord of Mytilene and a disappointed suitor of Zelmira, had invaded Lesbos with the intention of assassinating King Polidoro and taking over his throne. Zelmira, however, had managed to conceal her father in the royal mausoleum and then told Azor that he was hiding in the temple to Ceres. Azor burnt down the temple, thinking he had killed the King, but he was in turn killed on orders from Antenore, who also aspired to the throne.

Act 1
The Mytilene warriors are mourning the death of Azor. Antenore, with the help of Leucippo, plots to take over the throne of Lesbos by trying to incriminate Zelmira in the deaths of Azor and her father. At first, even Emma, Zelmira's confidante, believes the accusations. Fearing for the safety of her young son, Zelmira reveals to Emma that her father is still alive and asks her to take the child into hiding. Prince Ilo returns to the island. Zelmira is afraid to tell him of the accusations against her or to defend herself. Instead, Prince Ilo hears only Antenore's version of the story. Antenore is crowned King of Lesbos. Leucippo attempts to murder Ilo, but is stopped by Zelmira. Found with the dagger in her hand, Zelmira is now also accused of attempting to murder her husband and is imprisoned.

Act 2
Leucippo intercepts a letter from Zelmira to Ilo in which she tells him that her father is still alive and that the accusations against her are false. He and Antenore temporarily free her from prison and trick her into revealing her father's hiding place. Both father and daughter are recaptured and await their deaths at the hands of the plotters. Meanwhile, Prince Ilo is distraught at what he believes to be the death of Polidoro and the unhappy end to his marriage. Emma appears and tells Prince Ilo the truth about Zelmira. He and his men rescue Zelmira and Polidoro. Zelmira is happily reunited with her husband and child, while both Antenore and Leucippo are led off in chains.

Recordings

References
Notes

Sources
Gossett, Philip; Brauner, Patricia (2001), "Zelmira" in Holden, Amanda (ed.), The New Penguin Opera Guide, New York: Penguin Putnam. 
Greenwald, Helen and Hansell, Kathleen Kuzmick (2006), Zelmira: Dramma Per Musica in Two Acts by Andrea Leone Tottola. Critical edition prepared for the Fondazione Rossini, Vol. 33. Milan: Ricordi, 2006. Chicago: University of Chicago, 2006.   
Kalmus/Belwin Mills has reprinted a piano-vocal score of apparently French origin with a table of contents. No recitatives are given and whole scenes are omitted.
Osborne, Charles (1994), The Bel Canto Operas of Rossini, Donizetti, and Bellini, London: Methuen; Portland, Oregon: Amadeus Press.  
Osborne, Richard (1990), Rossini, Ithaca, New York: Northeastern University Press. 
Osborne, Richard (1998), "Zelmira", in  Stanley Sadie, (Ed.),  The New Grove Dictionary of Opera, Vol. Four, pp. 1223—1224. London: Macmillan Publishers, Inc.   
Scimone, Claudio, (Trans. John Underwood), Notes on Zelmira in booklet accompanying the 1989 Erato recording.
Stendhal, (translated and annotated by Richard N. Coe), Life of Rossini, University of Washington Press, 1972

External links
Text of Zelmire by Pierre-Laurent de Belloy 
The New York Times on the 1989 revival of Zelmira at the Rossini Opera Festival in Pesaro.
 The Scotsman on the 2003 concert performance in Edinburgh.
Chris Mullins, 'Recording review: Zelmira, Opera Rara', Opera Today, 22 December 2004.
The University of Chicago Center for Italian Opera Studies has a definitive role list from the critical edition by Greenwald and Hansell and some musical analysis.

Operas
Italian-language operas
Operas by Gioachino Rossini
Opera world premieres at the Teatro San Carlo
Operas based on plays
1822 operas
Operas set in ancient Greece
Libretti by Andrea Leone Tottola